Runcu Mare may refer to several villages in Romania:

 Runcu Mare, a village in Lelese Commune, Hunedoara County
 Runcu Mare, a village in Grădinari Commune, Olt County